The Bombardier INNOVIA APM 256 (internally code-named the Taipei Metro C370 or BT370 by the operational arm of Taipei Metro, Taipei Rapid Transit Corporation) is the second generation of automated guideway transit rolling stock to be used on Wenhu line (Brown Line) of the Taipei Metro. They are distinguished from their predecessors, Matra VAL256, by their circular front headlights and a grey livery, with a green stripe above. Also, instead of yellow forward-facing seats, the train offers blue seats that face inward.

A total of 101 2-car train sets were purchased and produced, for a total of 202 cars. The sets are numbered from 101 to 201, with both cars in a set receiving the same numbers. They were originally numbered from 52 to 152, continuing the sequence from the first-generation Matra-made sets, but in order to distinguish between the newer and older trains, they were renumbered from 101 onwards.

In May 2015, the Chicago O'Hare Airport Transit System (ATS) awarded Bombardier with a contract to supply 36 Innovia APM 256 vehicles, replacing all VAL 256 vehicles currently in service. The ATS was initially shut down for complete overhaul on 8 January 2019 and was expected to open in Autumn 2019, however this was delayed to 3 November 2021.

See also 
Taipei Metro VAL256 - Also serving on Wenhu line
Taipei Metro C301 - Serving on Tamsui–Xinyi line
Taipei Metro C321 - Serving on Bannan line
Taipei Metro C341 - Serving on Bannan line
Taipei Metro C371 - Serving on Songshan–Xindian line, Zhonghe–Xinlu line, Xinbeitou branch line and Xiaobitan branch line
Taipei Metro C381 - Serving on Tamsui–Xinyi line and Songshan–Xindian line
Airport Transit System - Transit system at Chicago O'Hare International Airport that uses 36 INNOVIA APM 256 cars

Notes

References

External links

Electric multiple units of the United States
Electric multiple units of Taiwan
Taipei Metro
Innovia people movers